Edward Barrie Stewart (29 October 1901 – 13 December 1979) was a New Zealand rugby union player. He was educated at Tokomairiro District High School and then John McGlashan College where he was a member of the 1st XV between 1919 and 1921. A Wing three-quarter, Stewart represented  and at a provincial level. He played one match for the New Zealand national side, the All Blacks, in the final match against the touring New South Wales team in 1923, scoring two tries in the 38–11 win. Stewart did not appear in any internationals.

He died in Timaru on 13 December 1979, and was buried at Timaru Cemetery.

References

1901 births
1979 deaths
People from Milton, New Zealand
People educated at John McGlashan College
New Zealand rugby union players
New Zealand international rugby union players
Otago rugby union players
Southland rugby union players
Rugby union wings
Burials at Timaru Cemetery
Rugby union players from Otago